The City Opera House is located at 106-112 Front Street in Traverse City, Michigan.  It was designated a Michigan State Historic Site in 1971 and listed on the National Register of Historic Places in 1972.

History
In 1891, entrepreneurs Perry Hannah, Charles Wilhelm, Tony Bartok, and Frank Votruba owned the property where the opera house now stands.  They hired architect E. R. Prall of Pontiac, Michigan to design this structure, and builder John Wilhelm to construct it.  At the time of construction, it was the first building in Traverse City to use electric lights. The City Opera House provided a 1200-seat performance space for traveling artists as well as a perfect setting for formal balls, such as an Installation Ball held in 1892.

In 1920, a local movie house leased the building and shuttered it to eliminate competition.  it was leased through the 1940s, and remained closed until 1985.  In 1978, work began to raise money for restoration.  In 1980, the owners gave the structure to the city, and restoration work began in 1985. In 2005, the bulk of a 30-year and 8.5 million dollar restoration was completed.

Description
The City Opera House is a square, three-story, building constructed of red brick.  It measures  on each side.  The ground floor houses commercial tenants; the opera house proper is located on the upper floors. Since completion of the restoration, the City Opera house has seating for 710 people, arches with trompe-l'œil clouds and a dome ornamented with angelic putti, a two-story oriel window, an acoustic stage shell, modern theatre rigging and complete facilities for catered events.

References

External links
 City Opera House, Traverse City

Music venues completed in 1891
Buildings and structures in Grand Traverse County, Michigan
Traverse City, Michigan
Theatres in Michigan
Tourist attractions in Grand Traverse County, Michigan
Event venues established in 1891
1891 establishments in Michigan
Michigan State Historic Sites
National Register of Historic Places in Grand Traverse County, Michigan
Opera houses on the National Register of Historic Places in Michigan
Opera houses in Michigan